Saturnalia is an ancient Roman festival in honor of the god Saturn.

Saturnalia may also refer to:

Literature
 Saturnalia (Callin novel), a 1986 science fiction novel by Grant Callin
 Saturnalia (Davis novel), a 2007 crime novel by Lindsey Davis
 Saturnalia (Macrobius), a work of Ambrosius Theodosius Macrobius
 Saturnalia (webcomic), a science fiction cartoon series by Nina Matsumoto

Music
 Saturnalia (The Gutter Twins album) (2008)
 Saturnalia (The Wedding Present album) (1996)
 "Saturnalia" (song), a song by Marilyn Manson

Other uses
 Saturnalia (dinosaur), a genus of dinosaur
 Saturnalia (horse) (foaled 2016), a Japanese Thoroughbred racehorse
 Saturnalia (PBM), a swords-and-sorcery play-by-mail game